Anna Sujatha Mathai is a poet from India.

Biography
Mathai was born to Syrian Christian parents.  She completed her B.A. (Honours) degree in English Language and Literature from Miranda College and post-graduate degree in Social Studies from the University of Edinburgh. She worked in this field in England for some years.

Mathai’s poems have been published in The Penguin Book of Contemporary Women Poets, In Their Own Voice, edited by Arlene R. K. Zide (1993), Contemporary Asian Poetry, Hong Kong and Singapore, edited by Agnes Lam (2014), Post-Independence Poetry by Indians in English, edited by Arundhathi Subramaniam (Sahitya Akademi).

Mathai has published five collections of poetry in English. Her poems have been translated into some Indian and European languages.

Selected works
 Crucifixions (1970) Writers Workshop, Calcutta
 We the Unreconciled (1972) Writers Workshop, Calcutta
 The Attic of Night (1991) Rupa  &Co. New Delhi
 Life - on my Side of the Street (2005) Sahitya Akademi. (Women Poets showcased for 50th Anniv. Of Sahitya Akademi.) Edited by Keki Daruwala.
 Mothers Veena and Selected Poems (2013) Authorspress

Inclusion in poetry anthologies
 Scaling Heights : An Anthology of Contemporary Indian English Poetry (2013) eds. by Dr. Gopal Lahiri and Dr.Kirti Sengupta and published by Authorspress, New Delhi

References

Indian women poets
Alumni of the University of Edinburgh
English-language poets from India
Living people
Year of birth missing (living people)